Samuel Hunter may refer to:

Samuel Hunter (cyclist) (1894–1976), British cyclist
Samuel Hunter (editor) (1769–1839), Scottish newspaper proprietor
Samuel Hunter (gymnast) (born 1988), British artistic gymnast
Samuel D. Hunter (born 1981), American playwright
Samuel Black Hunter (1855–1935), Canadian politician

See also
Sam Hunter (disambiguation)